Zhuangyuan Subdistrict is a subdistrict in Qixia, Shandong province, China. , it administers the following 45 villages:
Beiqilizhuang Village
Guzhendu Village
Xingjiatuan Village
Haojiatuan Village
Wanggezhuang Village
Zhugezhuang Village
Xiaoshiling Village
Xiejiagou Village
Nanyanzikou Village
Huangkuanglüjia Village
Loujia Village
Jujia Village
Beilinjiazhuang Village
Ma'er'ao Village
Hekou Village
Laoshu'ao Village
Shilipu Village
Gonghou Village
Gejiagou Village
Beiyanzikou Village
Heshangzhuang Village
Dujiazhuang Village
Fanjia Village
Lujia Village
Henan Village
Hebei Village
Gaojia Village
Majiatuan Village
Sunmazhuang Village
Shengjia Village
Caokuang Village
Cao'an Village
Luanjiakuang Village
Xiaowolong Village
Dawolong Village
Guandong Village
Xujiawa Village
Beizhangjiagou Village
Houjiagou Village
Beidingjiagou Village
Houkuang Village
Liujiagou Village
Chenjia Village
Moujia Village
Shangsongjia Village

See also 
 List of township-level divisions of Shandong

References 

Township-level divisions of Shandong
Qixia, Shandong